Justin Barrus Bean (born November 17, 1996) is an American professional basketball player for the Memphis Hustle of the NBA G League. He played college basketball for the Utah State Aggies.

High school career
Bean played basketball for Southmoore High School in Moore, Oklahoma. As a junior, he averaged about 22 points and 11 rebounds per game, but tore his anterior cruciate ligament in practice before the state playoffs. Bean returned in time for his senior season, averaging 16 points and nine rebounds per game. Following his graduation, he served a two-year mission for the Church of Jesus Christ of Latter-day Saints in Reno, Nevada.

College career
Bean joined Utah State as a preferred walk-on, and redshirted his first season with the team. He earned a scholarship in the middle of his freshman season. As a freshman, Bean averaged 4.1 points and 3.8 rebounds per game. In his sophomore season, he averaged 11.9 points and 10.5 rebounds per game, earning Third Team All-Mountain West and All-Defensive Team recognition. He became the first Utah State player to average a double-double since Mike Santos in the 1976–77 season. As a junior, Bean averaged 11.4 points and 7.7 rebounds per game, and was named to the Second Team All-Mountain West. On November 18, 2021, he posted a career-high 33 points and 16 rebounds in an 87–79 win against Penn in double overtime. Bean was named to the Second Team All-Mountain West as a senior. As a senior, he averaged 17.4 points, 9.9 rebounds and 2.6 assists per game. On March 23, 2022, Bean declared for the 2022 NBA draft, forgoing an extra season of college eligibility.

Professional career

Memphis Hustle (2022–present)
Shortly after the 2022 NBA Draft, Bean's agency announced he had signed a free agent deal with the Los Angeles Clippers. On November 4, 2022, Bean was named to the opening night roster for the Memphis Hustle.

Career statistics

College

|-
| style="text-align:left;"| 2017–18
| style="text-align:left;"| Utah State
| style="text-align:center;" colspan="11"|  Redshirt
|-
| style="text-align:left;"| 2018–19
| style="text-align:left;"| Utah State
| 29 || 0 || 12.1 || .512 || .167 || .763 || 3.8 || .8 || .7 || .3 || 4.1
|-
| style="text-align:left;"| 2019–20
| style="text-align:left;"| Utah State
| 34 || 34 || 29.7 || .518 || .276 || .806 || 10.5 || 2.1 || 1.5 || .7 || 11.9
|-
| style="text-align:left;"| 2020–21
| style="text-align:left;"| Utah State
| 29 || 29 || 27.1 || .518 || .238 || .829 || 7.7 || 1.9 || 1.3 || .3 || 11.4
|-
| style="text-align:left;"| 2021–22
| style="text-align:left;"| Utah State
| 34 || 34 || 35.4 || .534 || .465 || .800 || 9.9 || 2.6 || 1.6 || .5 || 17.4
|- class="sortbottom"
| style="text-align:center;" colspan="2"| Career
| 126 || 97 || 26.6 || .524 || .369 || .804 || 8.2 || 1.9 || 1.3 || .5 || 11.5

Personal life
Bean's father, Gordon, played college basketball for Ricks College and Idaho State. At Utah State, Bean signed a Name, Image and Likeness deal with TacoTime; the company had previously wanted to promote its bean burritos at Utah State home games, as the team featured Bean and Diogo Brito.

References

External links
Utah State Aggies bio

1996 births
Living people
American men's basketball players
Basketball players from Oklahoma
People from Moore, Oklahoma
Small forwards
Power forwards (basketball)
Utah State Aggies men's basketball players
American Mormon missionaries in the United States
21st-century Mormon missionaries
Latter Day Saints from Oklahoma